The 2012–13 FC Schalke 04 season was the 109th season in the club's football history. In 2012–13 the club plays in the Bundesliga, the top tier of German football. It is the clubs 22nd consecutive season in this league, having been promoted from the 2. Bundesliga in 1991.

Review and events
The club also takes part in the 2012–13 edition of the DFB-Pokal, where it reached the second round and will face 2. Bundesliga side SV Sandhausen next.

In Europe the club has qualified for the 2012–13 edition of the Champions League where it will play Olympiacos, Montpellier and Arsenal in Group B of the group stage.

Huub Stevens was sacked as head coach on 16 December 2012. Jens Keller replaced Stevens as head coach.

Competitions

Legend

Friendly matches

Bundesliga

League results

Final league table

DFB-Pokal

UEFA Champions League

Group stage

Knockout phase

Round of 16

Squad

Squad and statistics

|-style="background:#fcc;" 

|-bgcolor=ccccff 
|-style="background:#fcc;" 

|-style="background:#fcc;"  

|-bgcolor=ccccff 

|-bgcolor=ccccff 
|-bgcolor=ccccff 

|}

- transfers during the season. (blue)
- transfers during the season (away). (red)

Transfers

In

Out

Kits

Sources

Match reports

Other sources

External links
 2012–13 FC Schalke 04 season at Weltfussball.de 
 2012–13 FC Schalke 04 season at kicker.de 
 2012–13 FC Schalke 04 season at Fussballdaten.de 

Schalke 04
Schalke 04
FC Schalke 04 seasons